The 2012 NCAA Division I Football Championship Game was a postseason college football game between the North Dakota State Bison and the Sam Houston State Bearkats. It was played on January 7, 2012, at Pizza Hut Park in Frisco, Texas. The culminating game of the 2011 NCAA Division I FCS football season, it was won by North Dakota State, 17–6.

With sponsorship by Enterprise Rent-A-Car, the game was officially known as the NCAA FCS Championship presented by Enterprise Rent-A-Car. This was the final day that the name of the venue was officially Pizza Hut Park, although ESPN2 referred to it as FC Dallas Stadium during its broadcast.

Teams
The participants of the Championship Game were the finalists of the 2011 FCS Playoffs, which began with a 20-team bracket.

North Dakota State Bison

North Dakota State finished their regular season with a 10–1 record (7–1 in conference), including a win over Minnesota of the FBS. As the second-seed in the tournament, the Bison defeated James Madison, Lehigh, and third-seed Georgia Southern to reach the final. This was North Dakota State's first appearance in an FCS/Division I-AA title game.

Sam Houston State Bearkats

Sam Houston State finished their regular season with an 11–0 record (7–0 in conference), including a win over New Mexico of the FBS. As the first-seed in the tournament, the Bearkats defeated Stony Brook, Montana State, and fourth-seed Montana to reach the final. This was also Sam Houston State's first appearance in an FCS/Division I-AA championship game.

Game summary
First-half scoring was limited to three field goals, with the Bearkats holding a 6–3 lead at halftime. The only second-half scoring was a pair of touchdowns by the Bison; the first setup by a fake punt that gained 27 yards, and the second following a 63-yard interception return by the game's MVP, linebacker Travis Beck. The Bison won their first FCS championship via the 17–6 final score.

Scoring summary

Game statistics

References

Further reading

External links
 Box score at ESPN
 College Football NCAA Division I, Final North Dakota State vs Sam Houston State 01 07 2012 via YouTube

Championship Game
NCAA Division I Football Championship Games
North Dakota State Bison football games
Sam Houston Bearkats football games
American football in the Dallas–Fort Worth metroplex
Sports in Frisco, Texas
NCAA Division I Football Championship Game
NCAA Division I Football Championship Game